The 2006 CONCACAF Champions' Cup was the 41st edition of the annual international club football competition held in the CONCACAF region (North America, Central America and the Caribbean), the CONCACAF Champions' Cup. The tournament is also a qualifying event for the 2006 FIFA Club World Cup. Thirty-three teams from eighteen football associations took part, starting with the first qualifying games on July 26, 2005.

The tournament ended with a two-legged final between Mexican teams América and Toluca. The first leg was played at Estadio Nemesio Díez in Toluca, Mexico on April 12, 2006 and ended in a 0–0 draw. The second leg was played at Estadio Azteca in Mexico City on April 19, 2006 and ended with América scoring in extra time for a 2–1 win, therefore the Mexican side achieved their fifth CONCACAF trophy. With the victory, América qualified for the 2006 FIFA Club World Cup held in Japan.

Qualified teams

North American zone
 América - 2005 Clausura champion
 Toluca - 2005 Apertura champion
 Los Angeles Galaxy - 2005 MLS Cup champion
 New England Revolution - 2005 Eastern Conference champion

Central American zone
 Alajuelense - UNCAF champion
 Olimpia - UNCAF runner-up
 Saprissa - UNCAF third place

Caribbean zone
 Portmore United - 2005 CFU Club Championship winner

Bracket

Quarterfinals

Toluca won 4–1 on aggregate.

Saprissa won 3–2 on aggregate.

Alajuelense won 1–0 on aggregate.

América won 7–3 on aggregate.

Semifinals

Toluca won 4–3 on aggregate.

América won 2–1 on aggregate.

Final

First leg

Second leg 

América won 3–1 on points (2–1 on aggregate).

Champion

Top scorers

References

1
CONCACAF Champions' Cup